John Cundle (born 6 August 1939) is an English former cricketer who played as a right-handed batsman for Hertfordshire. He was born in Welwyn Garden City.

Cundle, who represented the team in the Minor Counties Championship between 1961 and 1978, made a single List A appearance for the team, in the 1964 Gillette Cup, against Durham. From the opening order, he scored 2 runs, in a match in which Hertfordshire finished with just 63 runs on the board.

External links
John Cundle at Cricket Archive

1939 births
Living people
English cricketers
Hertfordshire cricketers
Sportspeople from Welwyn Garden City